
Year 125 (CXXV) was a common year starting on Sunday (link will display the full calendar) of the Julian calendar. At the time, it was known as the Year of the Consulship of Paullinus and Titius (or, less frequently, year 878 Ab urbe condita). The denomination 125 for this year has been used since the early medieval period, when the Anno Domini calendar era became the prevalent method in Europe for naming years.

Events 
 By place 

 Roman Empire 
 The Pantheon is constructed (in Rome) as it stands today, by Hadrian.
 Emperor Hadrian establishes the Panhellenion.
 Hadrian distributes imperial lands to small farmers.
 Hadrian's Villa, Tivoli, Italy, starts to be built (approximate date).

 Africa 
 Plague sweeps North Africa in the wake of a locust invasion that destroys large areas of cropland. The plague kills as many as 500,000 in Numidia and possibly 150,000 on the coast before moving to Italy, where it takes so many lives that villages and towns are abandoned.

 Asia 
 Last (4th) year of the Yanguang era of the Chinese Han Dynasty.
 Change of emperor of the Chinese Han Dynasty from Han Andi to Marquis of Beixiang, then to Han Shundi.
 Gautamiputra Satakarni, a king of the Andhra dynasty, conquers the Konkan near Bombay. He then controls central India from coast to coast.
 Zhang Heng of Han Dynasty China invents a hydraulic-powered armillary sphere.
 The epoch of the Javanese calendar begins.

 By topic 

 Arts and sciences 
 The Satires of Juvenal intimate that bread and circuses (panem et circenses) keep the Roman people happy.

 Religion 
 Pope Telesphorus succeeds Pope Sixtus I as the eighth pope according to Roman Catholic tradition.

Births 
 Aulus Gellius, Roman author and grammarian (approximate date)
 Lucian, Syrian satirist and rhetorician (approximate date)
 Lucius Ferenius, Dutch potter in Heerlen (approximate date)
 Tiberius Claudius Pompeianus, Roman politician (d. 193)

Deaths 
 April 30 – An of Han, Chinese emperor (b. AD 94)
 December 10 – Shao (or Liu Yi), Chinese emperor
 Servius Sulpicius Similis, Roman governor
 Thamel, Roman Christian priest and martyr

References